John Fanning (born 3 April 1973) is an Irish novelist and writer.

Biography
Fanning was born in Dublin. He currently lives in France.

Career
Fanning is the author of the novel Ezekiel.

The "warm-hearted book plays with the conventions of epic", its protagonist, Ezekiel Yusuf Moran, coming of age in Provence and becoming a resistant during WWII before journeying through postwar Europe for many years.

Fanning received a master's degree from University College Dublin in the early nineties, after a primary degree at Maynooth University.

Bibliography

Novels
 Ezekiel (2018)

References

External links
 
 

Living people
Irish male novelists
1973 births
Alumni of University College Dublin
Alumni of Maynooth University